Netball Superleague Player of the Season. The following is a list of Netball Superleague players named Player of the Season.

Winners 

Notes
  The 2020 season was not completed due to the COVID-19 pandemic.

References

 
Lists of netball players